Huxley's layer is the second layer of the inner root sheath of the hair and consists of one or two layers of horny, flattened, nucleated cells. It lies between Henle's layer and the cuticle. The layer is named after English biologist Thomas Henry Huxley.

See also
 Thomas Huxley

References

External links
Hair Transplant

Hair anatomy